William Washington RBA ARCA ARE (1885 – 18 July 1956) was a British engraver and painter and Principal of the Hammersmith School of Art for 20 years.

Washington was born in Marple, Cheshire, a son of a railway signalman, and started his studies at Ashton-under-Lyne’s Hegginbottom Art School whilst working for a printing company. He would finish his studies at the Royal College of Art between 1906 and 1910. He obtained his first teaching job at the Southend College of Art, moving onto Clapham School of Art before he was appointed at  Hammersmith in 1929.

He exhibited at the Royal Academy of Art, the Royal Society of British Artists, the Paris Salon while the Victoria and Albert Museum and the British Museum hold permanent collections of his work. The Studio magazine described his work as: 

His work was part of the painting event in the art competition at the 1948 Summer Olympics. In 1954 he was elected Master of the Art Workers' Guild.

Legacy

In 2014 the Washington Foundation was set up in memory of both William Washington, and his son, ceramicist R J Washington, with the aim of supporting emerging artists to develop their skills.

References

1885 births
1956 deaths
20th-century British painters
British male painters
Olympic competitors in art competitions
People from Marple, Greater Manchester
Masters of the Art Worker's Guild
20th-century British male artists